Salvia longistyla, Mexican sage, is a Mexican plant species which flowers in mid-autumn. It is not hardy, and is grows best in a container, propagated from cuttings. This salvia has handsome, green foliage, and the flowering stems have long, deep, wine-red flowers.

References

longistyla
Flora of Mexico